Acrocercops ornata is a moth of the family Gracillariidae, known from Grenada. It was described by Thomas de Grey, 6th Baron Walsingham, in 1897.

References

ornata
Moths of the Caribbean
Moths described in 1897